The SX carriages were a type of passenger carriages constructed by Commonwealth Engineering for the Queensland Railways in 1961-1962.

History
The SX carriage stainless steel bodyshells were constructed by Commonwealth Engineering, Granville with the fitout undertaken at Rocklea in 1961/62. They were built to operate suburban services on the Brisbane rail network. They shared many components with the New South Wales U set carriages.

Initially hauled by steam and later diesel locomotives, provision was made for their conversion to electric multiple units once the network was electrified. Sixteen seven-carriage sets were completed. The conversion never occurred and they were gradually replaced from the 1980s as EMUs and SMUs entered service. The last was withdrawn on 2 December 1999.

To allow extra services to be operated during the 1987 America's Cup yacht regatta in Fremantle, 14 were leased to Transperth in October 1986. Initially intended as a short-term deal, they would remain in Perth until returned to Queensland in 1991. Others were exported to the Auckland Regional Council, Ferrocarril de Antofagasta a Bolivia and State Railway of Thailand.

Zig Zig Railway - Auckland set

Seven SX carriages were imported to New Zealand in the early 2000s. A set of six were overhauled for the Auckland Regional Council. These were overhauled by the Hillside Workshops in 2002/2003, further refurbished in 2008/2009 and retired in 2014/15 as the AM class EMUs were introduced. SXA1744 was sold by Auckland Transport in its imported condition to Dunedin Railways and was used for storage. It was later on sold and is now privately owned and located near Bluff as of 2021. The six carriages in MAXX livery were stored in Taumarunui in the central North Island until sold for a dollar each to the Railway Enthusiasts Society. Five of the number consisted of AT MAXX set of SXV1697, SXC1741, SXC1742, SXC1743 and SXV1746. After a detailed inspection, they did not fulfil their needs and were advertised to Australian and New Zealand preservations groups. One was sold to Taumarunui Rail Action Centre Trust. There was no further interest in the remaining five, so they were advertised on auction site TradeMe and were sold to private owners around New Zealand with bogies in March 2021 and were removed from Taumarunui on 17 June 2021. SXC1743 was relocated to Whanganui, SXC1742 went to Hastings and the remaining three carriages went to a single owner in Taupo.

One set (7 cars) has been retained by Queensland Rail's Heritage Division while others have been preserved including seven at the DownsSteam Tourist Railway & Museum, another set in Cairns with Cairns Kuranda Steam Pty Ltd (stored in Cairns) and a set owned by Queensland University of Technology (stored at Ipswich).

References

Railway coaches of New Zealand
Railway coaches of Queensland